Karim bin Mansor is the state legislative assembly member of Selangor representing Tanjung Sepat. He is a local leader who initiated the popular "homestay" project in Tanjung Sepat and created a business oriented kampung for the benefits of the people in the Tanjung Sepat and Morib area.

Relation with the Orang Asli
Being a Malay Muslim does not deter Dr Karim Mansor to be a friend and act as a protector to the Orang Asli tribes in Selangor. Dr. Karim Mansor has been invited to many of the events organized or attended by many of the Orang Asli Tribes and association.

Honours 
  :
  Knight Commander of the Order of the Crown of Selangor (DPMS) - Dato' (2002)

References

1946 births
Living people
Malaysian Muslims
United Malays National Organisation politicians
Malaysian people of Malay descent
People from Selangor
Members of the Selangor State Legislative Assembly
Selangor state executive councillors
Knights Commander of the Order of the Crown of Selangor